Daklane Ward is a ward located under Nagaland's capital city, Kohima. The ward falls under the designated Ward No. 7 of the Kohima Municipal Council.

Education
Educational Institutions in Daklane Ward:

Colleges 
 Mount Olive College

Schools 
 Charity School
 Daklane Government Middle School

See also
 Municipal Wards of Kohima

References

External links
 Map of Kohima Ward No. 7

Kohima
Wards of Kohima